Ralph Thomas Puett lll (born January 12, 1971) is an American actor, singer, dancer, and businessman. He is best known for his role as Tyler Benchfield on Life Goes On. Tommy left the show in 1991. Tommy is the older brother of former Kids Incorporated star Devyn Puett. In high school Tommy was signed to Scotti Brothers Records. Tommy released his only album Life Goes On in 1990. That same year Tommy's only video album Heart Attack was released. Devyn sang back up vocals on the album. After releasing Life Goes On Tommy was cast as Ben in Switchback in 1997. Switchback was Tommy's last acting role.

Personal life
Tommy retired from acting in 1997. Tommy Puett graduated from Diamond Bar High School in 1989. Tommy and his wife Robin have two children named Ralph Thomas Puett IV and Cameron Bae Puett. After retiring from acting Tommy went on to pursue a career in business. He now runs Ultra Sport Products.

Filmography

Award nominations

Albums
 Life Goes On (1990)

Video albums
 Heart Attack (1990)

References

External links
 
 

American male film actors
Living people
1971 births
People from Diamond Bar, California
People from Gary, Indiana
American male dancers
21st-century American businesspeople
21st-century American singers
21st-century American male singers
Scotti Brothers Records artists